Western Province City cricket team was a Sri Lankan First-class cricket team. The team was established in 1991 and featured only in the Inter-Provincial First Class Tournament. The team won three championships.

Players

Squad

Notable players

 Roy Dias

Honours

Domestic

First Class
Inter-Provincial First Class Tournament: 3
 1990–91
 1993–94
 1994–95

References

External links
 Western Province City, CricketArchive

Sport in Colombo
Former senior cricket clubs of Sri Lanka